Santa Gadea is a church dedicated to Saint Agatha in Burgos, Spain. The church is famous in history and literature for being the site where Rodrigo Díaz de Vivar (El Cid) at the behest of the Castilian Cortes, forced Alfonso VI to swear an oath that he was not an accomplice in the death of his brother, Sancho while he was besieging Zamora. Es el de la jura de Santa Gadea is the most notable Spanish medieval romance about this event.

Notes

External links
 A page which explains the history of the Oath and the dynastic and military battles behind it.

Roman Catholic churches in Burgos